Boris Vasilyev may refer to:
Boris Vasilyev (cyclist) (1937–2000), Russian Olympic cyclist
Boris Vasilyev (writer) (1924–2013), Russian writer